Rosie Thomas is an American singer-songwriter and comedian, originally from Michigan.

Career
Raised in Detroit, Thomas learned piano and guitar as a child. She attended Calvary Chapel Bible College in Murrieta, California, for a year before studying Theatre at Cornish College in Seattle.

Through mutual friends she met Trey Many and began playing shows with Velour 100. They recorded one EP together and played a few short tours, where she met Damien Jurado and David Bazan.

Thomas' appearance on the song "Parking Lot", from Damien Jurado's album Ghost of David, brought her to the attention of Sub Pop Records, who signed her in 2000. Her first recording for the label was a duet with Jurado on "Wages of Sin" on Badlands: A Tribute To Bruce Springsteen's Nebraska. Her debut album When We Were Small was released on January 22, 2002. The album featured Eric Fisher (who Thomas met at Cornish College) on guitar and keyboards and Andy Myers on drums. Fisher and Myers returned for 2003's follow-up, Only with Laughter Can You Win.

Thomas released her third album, If Songs Could Be Held, in 2005. In March 2006, her song "Faith's Silver Elephant" appeared on the Paper Bag Records compilation  See You on the Moon! .

In April 2006, Pitchfork erroneously reported that Thomas and American musician Sufjan Stevens were having a baby together, but later published a retraction. Denison Witmer and Thomas later admitted it was an April Fools' prank.

Thomas' album These Friends of Mine was released on December 12, 2006, through her record label Sing-A-Long Records, which also released a holiday album called A Very Rosie Christmas in November 2008. Thomas acted in the 2009 film Calvin Marshall and was the subject of the 2009 documentary All the Way from Michigan Not Mars. She suffered from a thyroid condition that affected her for two years, leading to a gap of four years until her next album With Love (2012). She married folk singer Jeff Shoop in August 2008.<ref name="Durbin">Durbin, Kelly (2008) "Rosie Thomas: Sing, Laugh, Love ... Then Get Knocked Up", 'Real Detroit Weekly, December 2, 2008. Retrieved January 27, 2014</ref>

Thomas toured with Sufjan Stevens in his 2012 Surfjohn Stephanopolous Seasonal Affective Disorder Disaster on Ice tour, opening the show as her Sheila Saputo character as well as performing as a member of his band.

Comedy
Thomas performs as a comedian as the character Sheila Saputo, an accident-prone pizza delivery person.Foster, Patrick (2004) "Pop Music", The Washington Post, April 20, 2004. She has performed stand-up as this character as part of her music shows.

Discography

Albums
 When We Were Small (2001), Sub Pop
 Only with Laughter Can You Win (2003), Sub Pop
 If Songs Could Be Held (2005), Sub Pop
 These Friends of Mine (2006), Sing-A-Long/Nettwerk
 A Very Rosie Christmas (2008)
 All the Way from Michigan Not Mars (2010)
 With Love (2012)

EPs
 In Between (2001)
 Paper Airplane (2002)
 Lullabies for Parents, Vol. 1 (2022)

Singles
 "Pretty Dress" (2005)

Compilation appearances
 "Just a Closer Walk With Thee" – Bifrost Arts' Come O Spirit'' (Sounds Familyre 2009)

References

External links

 

Living people
1970s births
People from Livonia, Michigan
Singers from Michigan
Cornish College of the Arts alumni
Year of birth missing (living people)
American performers of Christian music
American stand-up comedians
Sub Pop artists
Indie folk musicians
21st-century American singers
21st-century American women singers
21st-century American comedians